Bramming is a railway town in Esbjerg Municipality, Region of Southern Denmark in Denmark. It is located at the Lunderskov-Esbjerg railway line and has a population of 7,111 (1 January 2022). 

Bramming was the municipal seat of the former Bramming Municipality until 1 January 2007.

See also
 Bramminge train accident

References

 Cities and towns in the Region of Southern Denmark